Nationwide Bank may refer to:
Nationwide Mutual Insurance Company
Nationwide Building Society